Witsen is a Dutch surname and may refer to:
Members of the Witsen family:
Cornelis Jan Witsen
Nicolaes Witsen
Willem Witsen
10653 Witsen, asteroid